Jennifer Hens (born 1 August 1986) is an Australian sports shooter. She competed in the women's 10 metre air rifle event at the 2016 Summer Olympics.

References

External links
 

1986 births
Living people
Australian female sport shooters
Olympic shooters of Australia
Shooters at the 2016 Summer Olympics
Place of birth missing (living people)
People from the Central Tablelands
Sportswomen from New South Wales
21st-century Australian women